Prince Dasho Jigyel Ugyen Wangchuck (born 16 July 1984) is a Bhutanese prince. Born as the second son of the King of Bhutan Jigme Singye Wangchuck, he was the heir presumptive to the throne of Bhutan until 5 February 2016, when his nephew Jigme Namgyel Wangchuck, his older half-brother and current King Jigme Khesar Namgyel Wangchuck's son, was born.

Prince Jigyel Ugyen is the second son of King Jigme Singye Wangchuck from Queen Mother Ashi Dorji Wangmo Wangchuck. He has an older sister, Princess Ashi Sonam Dechen Wangchuck, as well as four half-brothers and four half-sisters.

Education
He was educated at Yangchenphug Higher Secondary School, then Choate Rosemary Hall in Wallingford, Connecticut, USA, graduating in 2003. He read Modern History and Political Science at St Peter's College, Oxford, in the United Kingdom starting in 2003 and graduating in 2007.

Royal duties
Sharing responsibilities with his siblings, Prince Jigyel Ugyen travels extensively to represent the King in various functions in Bhutan as well as abroad. In 2008 he travelled to the Smithsonian Folklife Festival where he delivered an opening address before roaming the festival area, and interacting with visitors. At the end of the festival, he travelled with several performers to attend the Bhutan Festival 2008 at the University of Texas at El Paso.

As the King's representative and President to the Bhutan Olympic Committee (BOC), he visited Copenhagen in order to attend the XIII Olympic Congress in 2009.

He was appointed to the Chairmanship during the 34th General Assembly of the Olympic Council of Asia, held in Ashgabat, Turkmenistan and will chair the committee for four years from 2015 to 2019. On 9 October 2018, His Royal Highness was elected as an International Olympic Committee member, whose candidature was linked to a function within the NOC, that is the Bhutan Olympic Committee.

Personal interests
He and his brothers share interests in various sporting activities, such as archery, basketball, golf, football and cycling.

He initiated the Tour of the Dragon in Bhutan, a mountain bike race covering 268 km, from central to western Bhutan in 2010.

Humanitarian causes
The prince with his sister, Princess Ashi Sonam Dechen, are collaborating in the Tarayana Foundation (TF) as board members. Founded by their mother, Queen Mother Ashi Dorji Wangmo, the foundation focuses on various efforts to reduce poverty in Bhutan. The prince is also the founder of Bhutan Philanthropy Ventures, a social enterprise established to support the Tarayana Foundation.

See also
 House of Wangchuck
 Line of succession to the Bhutanese throne

Notes

External links
BBC News: Prince swaps classroom for war

1984 births
Living people
Bhutanese monarchy
Choate Rosemary Hall alumni
Alumni of St Peter's College, Oxford
International Olympic Committee members
Sons of kings